Rohtas District  is one of the thirty-eight districts of Bihar state, India. It came into existence when Shahabad District was bifurcated into Bhojpur & Rohtas in 1972. Administrative headquarter of the district is Sasaram. Rohtas district has the highest literacy in Bihar. The literacy rate of Rohtas district which is 73.37% as per 2011 census is highest among all 38 districts of Bihar.

Rohtas district also has one of the highest forest cover among all 38 districts of Bihar.

The Rohtas district is a part of Patna Division, and it has an area of 3850 km², a population of 2,959,918 (2011 census), and a population density of 763 persons per km². Languages spoken here are Bhojpuri, Hindi and English.

History

Rohtas district was created in 1972, when the former Shahabad district was divided in two. It corresponded to the former district's sub-divisions of Sasaram and Bhabua. In 1991, Bhabua was split off as a separate district, which was renamed Kaimur district in 1994.

The district is a part of the Red Corridor.

Geography
This makes it the 4th-largest district in Bihar.

Rohtas district can be divided into two major natural areas. In the north and northeast is the Sasaram Plain, an alluvial plain sloping gently downward toward the northeast. Its average height ranges from 72m above sea level in the north to 153m above sea level in the south. The plains cover all of Dinara, Dawath, Bikramganj, Nasriganj, Nokha, and Dehri Blocks, as well as parts of Sasaram, Sheosagar, and Rohtas Blocks. There are scattered woodlands in the east, in Sasaram Block. In the southern part of the district is the Rohtas Plateau, which is an eastern flank of the Vindhya plateau with an average elevation of 300m above sea level. It covers parts of Nauhatta, Rohtas, Sheosagar, Sasaram, and Chenari Blocks. This area is hilly, with occasional forests throughout. Several streams flow toward the north, including the Durgawati, the Bajari, the Koel, and the Sura. The Rohtas Plateau is less well suited for agriculture due to the uneven, rocky and gravelly soils as well as the forest cover. A variety of long grasses grow naturally on the plateau, including pear grass, kus, and khas khas.

Throughout Rohtas district, the soils are generally classified as ustalfs, ochrepts, orthents, fluvents, and psamments.

Sub-divisions
Rohtas district is divided into 19 community development blocks, which are grouped together into 3 sub-divisions based at Sasaram, Bikramganj, and Dehri, respectively.

The 19 CD Blocks are as follows:
 Kochas
 Dinara
 Dawath
 Suryapura
 Bikramganj
 Karakat
 Nasriganj
 Rajpur
 Sanjhauli
 Nokha
 Kargahar
 Chenari
 Nauhatta
 Sheosagar
 Sasaram
 Akorhi Gola
 Dehri
 Tilauthu
 Rohtas

There are 10 towns in Rohtas district, as follows:

There are 246 gram panchayats in Rohtas district as of 2011.

Politics 
  

|}

Economy
Economy of the district is agriculture based. Rice, wheat and maize are the main crops. Rohtas is also called the “Rice bowl of Bihar”. Until 1980, Dalmianagar was one of the major industrial cities in India. It had sugar, vegetable oil, cement, paper, and chemical factories but now they are closed.

In 2006 the Ministry of Panchayati Raj named Rohtas one of the country's 250 most backward districts (out of a total of 640). It is one of the 36 districts in Bihar have received funds from the Backward Regions Grant Fund Programme (BRGF).

Demographics

According to the 2011 census Rohtas district has a population of 2,959,918, roughly equal to the nation of Armenia or the US state of Mississippi. This gives it a ranking of 127th in India (out of a total of 640). In Bihar, it is ranked 17th out of 38 in terms of population. Its population growth rate over the decade 2001–2011 was 20.22%. Rohtas has a sex ratio of 918 females for every 1000 males, which ranks 22nd out of 38 in Bihar (the state ratio is also 918). 14.45% of the population live in urban areas. Scheduled Castes and Scheduled Tribes make up 18.57% and 1.07% of the population respectively.

The literacy rate in Rohtas district was 73.37% as of 2011 which is highest among all 38 districts of Bihar. The literacy rate was higher for men than for women: 82.88% of men but only 62.97% of women in the district could read and write. Literacy also was higher in urban areas than rural ones. The highest literacy rate in Rohtas district could be found in the town and sub-district of Dehri - 77.70% of the district's total population, and 81.2% of the population of the town proper, was literate. The lowest literacy rate was in the entirely rural CD block of Nauhatta, where 63.07% of the population could read and write.

A majority of the working population of Rohtas district was employed in agriculture in 2011, with 23.58% being cultivators who owned or rented their own land and 43.85% being agricultural laborers who worked someone else's land for wages. Another 5.25% of the district's workforce was employed in household industries, and all other forms of employment accounted for the remaining 27.33%.

Languages

At the time of the 2011 Census of India, 87.67% of the population in the district spoke Bhojpuri, 7.47% Hindi and 4.39% Urdu as their first language.

Flora and fauna

References

External links 
 Official website

 
Patna division
Districts of Bihar